Micheline Maylor (born in 1970) is a Canadian poet, academic, critic and editor.

Early life
Maylor was born in Windsor, Ontario of Voyageur Metis, and English ancestry. She moved to Calgary, Alberta and was raised as a Buddhist by artist parents.

Education
Maylor holds a BA from the University of Calgary (honours with a specialty in creative writing and a minor in anthropology). She earned a master's degree from Lancaster University UK (distinction in creative writing/Can-Lit). She was awarded the International Research Scholarship and the Overseas Research Scholarship. She was awarded a Ph.D from Newcastle upon Tyne (Late 20th century Canadian literature and creative writing).

Career

Poetry
Maylor's first book, Full Depth: The Raymond Knister Poems was long listed for the ReLit award and inspired by living in John Knister's ancestral home.

Her Chapbook, Starfish, an elegiac long poem written on the death of her best friend, sold out in 2007.

Her third collection, Whirr and Click, was short-listed for the Pat Lowther Award for best book written by a Canadian woman in 2014, about which Douglas Glover writes, "Micheline Maylor writes poems with dash and élan, attack poems, full of desire, heart, dangerous men and revenge."

Her fourth collection, Little Wildheart, published by the University of Alberta Press, was short-listed for the Robert Kroetsch award for experimental poetry and deals with the question: What does it mean to be human?  Quill and Quire gave it a starred review calling it "a charming quirk", and The Toronto Star described it as: "poems that crackle with lyric energy".

Micheline Maylor's anthology, Drifting Like a Metaphor, introduces Calgary poets of promise who have the ability to make connections that work to pull together language, image, and emotion. Her criterion was that the poets are not yet published in book form, but are able to make story and voice work to create an emotional reaction through many forms and styles. Any of the twelve poets showcased in this anthology could easily become the next great voice or future poet laureate of Calgary.

Maylor has published her fifth book, "The Bad Wife"  which was long listed for the Raymond Souster Award (2022). and Short Listed for the Robert Kroetsch Best Poetry Award

Her poetry has been published in over 85 journals in five countries.

Influences come from Don Coles, Jeffery Donaldson, Douglas Glover, Patrick Lane, George Elliot Clark, Richard Harrison, and Jan Zwicky.

Editor
Maylor is the co-founder of the non-profit Freefall Literary Society where she was the editor-in-chief from 2006-2016 and is now consulting editor, before shifting to Frontenac House Press. She currently edits the Quartet poetry series for which the authors have been shortlisted or have won: The Goldie Award for best Lesbian poetry book in North America; The Gerald Lampert Award for best first book; The Pat Lowther Award for best book by a Canadian woman; The Stephan G. Stephansson Award for best Alberta poetry book; The Alberta Readers' Choice Awards; The City of Calgary W.O. Mitchell Award; and the Alberta Magazine Publisher's Awards in several categories.

Maylor was the editor of the awarding winning "This Wound is a World" by Billy-Ray Belcourt published by Frontenac House, which won the prestigious 2018 Griffin Poetry Prize, and The Most Significant Book of Poetry in English by an Emerging Indigenous Writer, Indigenous Voices Awards (2018), and the Robert Kroetsch City of Edmonton Book Prize (2018). It was also short listed for the Gerald Lampert Memorial Award (2018), and the Raymond Souster Award (2018).

Maylor was the editor of the award-winning "Ruba'iyat For the Time of Apricots" by Basma Kavanagh published by Frontenac House, which won the Robert Kroetsch Award for Poetry awarded by the Book Publisher's Association of Alberta on Sept 13, 2019.

She is a regular poetry reviewer at Quill and Quire.

Teaching and mentoring
She held a teaching position and has won awards at Mount Royal University. where she won the Faculty Award for Excellence in Teaching by Mount Royal Faculty Association. She also has held a teaching position at The University of Calgary.   She retired in 2022.

Following the tradition of many Canadian Writers, she is a long-time member of the League of Canadian Poets.

Appointments
On 25 April 2016 Micheline Maylor was sworn in as Calgary's first female Poet Laureate for a two-year term, and as such acts as an ambassador of the arts to the citizens of Calgary. The Calgary Poet Laureate produces literary work that is reflective of Calgary's landscape, cityscape and/or civic identity and that may raise awareness of local issues and is an initiative of the Calgary, an initiative of the Calgary Arts Development Authority

She was appointed as Author in Residence for the Calgary Public Library on 26 April 2016.  She is the Author in Residence at the Alexandra Writers Centre Society in 2017 and will be the Author in Residence at the Saskatchewan Writer's Guild Retreat in November 2019

Maylor was elected to the Senate of the University of Calgary for a three-year term commencing in September, 2017.  Maylor was also a member of the Calgary Institute of Humanities Advisory Board.

Maylor was appointed as a member of the Mount Royal University Distinguished Faculty Academy in May 2018 as a result of receiving the Mount Royal University 2018 Distinguished Faculty Award for Contract Faculty.

Awards
 Short List Petra Kenny Award for poetry 2007 
 Flair Foundation Creativity grant for Banff Centre 2010
 3rd place Geist post card story contest 2013 
 Short List Pat Lowther Award for poetry 2014 
 Mount Royal University Faculty Association Excellence in Teaching 2015
 Short List Robert Kroetsch Innovative Poetry Award 2016
Long List for the Pat Lowther Poetry Award 2017
Long List for the Raymond Souster Poetry 2017
Mount Royal University 2018 Distinguished Faculty Award for Contract Faculty
Alberta Magazine Publishers Association Volunteer of the Year 2020
Lois Hole Award for Editorial Excellence - For Quartet 2019 - Frontenac House (Editor) 2020
Book Publisher’s Association of Alberta, Robert Kroetsch Award for Poetry, Best poetry book published in Alberta 2021 
Queen’s Platinum Jubilee medal 2022

Selected bibliography

Books
 2021 - The Bad Wife (University of Alberta Press)   
 2018 – Drifting Like a Metaphor (Frontenac House Ed. Micheline Maylor) 
 2017 – Little Wildheart (University of Alberta Press)   
 2013 – Whirr and Click (Frontenac House Ed. Rose Scollard) 
 2011 – Starfish (Rubicon Press Ed. Jenna Butler) 
 2007 – Full Depth: The Raymond Knister poems (Wolsak and Wynn Ed. Maria Jacobs)

Anthologies
 Shy (University of Alberta Press) 2013. 
 Poems for Planet Earth (Leaf Press) 2013
 Freshwater Pearls (Recliner Books) 2011
 Home and Away (House of Blue Skies) 2009

References

External links 
Official website

1970 births
Living people
Alumni of Lancaster University
Canadian women poets
Chapbook writers
University of Calgary alumni
Writers from Windsor, Ontario
Poets Laureate of Calgary
20th-century Canadian poets
21st-century Canadian poets
20th-century Canadian women writers
21st-century Canadian women writers